Sancha of Castile may refer to:
Sancha of Castile, Queen of Navarre (c.1139-1179),daughter of Alfonso VII of Castile and his first wife Berenguela of Barcelona; wife of Sancho VI of Navarre
Sancha of Castile, Queen of Aragon (1154/5 – 1208), daughter of King Alfonso VII of Castile by his second queen, Richeza of Poland; wife of Alfonso II of Aragon

See also
Sancha of León (disambiguation)